Criders is an unincorporated community located in Rockingham County, in the U.S. state of Virginia. It is located in George Washington National Forest, west of Bergton near the state border with West Virginia.

References

Unincorporated communities in Rockingham County, Virginia
Unincorporated communities in Virginia